Buffalo, New York and its greater metropolitan area is currently home to two major league sports teams. The Buffalo Sabres (National Hockey League) play in the City of Buffalo, and the Buffalo Bills (National Football League) play in the suburb of Orchard Park. Buffalo is also home to several minor league sports teams, including the Buffalo Bisons (International League), Buffalo Bandits (National Lacrosse League) and FC Buffalo (National Premier Soccer League). Several local colleges and universities are active in college athletics, including Canisius College, Niagara University and The State University of New York at Buffalo at the NCAA Division I level. Buffalo was host city for the 1993 World University Games, for which Burt Flickinger Center and University at Buffalo Stadium were built.

Sports are a major part of the city's culture. In recent decades, Buffalo based teams have become known for crushing and sometimes controversial defeats. Wide Right, No Goal and the Music City Miracle have come to define the suffering of Buffalo sports fans. In February 2012, Forbes listed Buffalo #4 on its list of "Most Miserable Sports Cities." The city's only major championships were American Football League titles won by the Buffalo Bills in 1964 and 1965.

Buffalo had three franchises in major league sports beginning in 1970, when the Buffalo Bills (established 1960) were joined by the Buffalo Braves of the National Basketball Association and the Buffalo Sabres of the National Hockey League. However, the Braves struggled financially and were relocated to California in 1978. This led to the perception that Buffalo's market could not support a third franchise. Sahlen Field was built in 1988 for the minor league Buffalo Bisons with hopes that it could attract a Major League Baseball franchise to the city. The major league franchise never came, although the Toronto Blue Jays would eventually play their home games at Sahlen Field in 2020 and 2021 because of the COVID-19 pandemic.

Joe Mesi was a professional boxer from Buffalo who earned the nickname "Third Franchise" during his undefeated career between 1997 and 2007 after selling out KeyBank Center and other local venues multiple times.

Current teams

* American Football League (AFL) championships were earned prior to the AFL–NFL merger of 1970.

** College Hockey America (CHA) men's hockey championships were earned prior to the league's discontinuation of the conference's men's program in 2010.† Date refers to current incarnation; Buffalo Bisons previously operated from 1886 to 1970, and the current Bisons count this team as part of their history.

Former teams

The Buffalo Bisons of the International Association for Professional Base Ball Players in 1878, and later from 1887 to 1888.
 The Buffalo Bisons of the National League from 1879 to 1885.
 The Buffalo Bisons of the International League from 1886 to 1970.
 The Buffalo Bisons of the Players' League in 1890.
 The Buffalo Germans of the Amateur Athletic Association from 1895 to 1925.
 The Buffalo Blues of the Federal League of from 1914 to 1915.
 The Tonawanda Kardex Lumbermen of the New York Pro Football League and National Football League from 1916 to 1921.
 The Buffalo franchise of the New York Pro Football League and National Football League from 1918 to 1929.
 The Buffalo Bisons of the American Basketball League from 1925 to 1926.
 The Buffalo Bisons of the International Hockey League from 1928 to 1936.
 The Buffalo Majors of the American Hockey Association from 1930 to 1932.
 The Buffalo Bowmans of the Indoor Professional Lacrosse League in 1932.
 The Buffalo Bisons of the National Basketball League in 1937.
 The Buffalo Bisons of the American Hockey League from 1940 to 1970.
 The Buffalo Indians/Tigers of the American Football League from 1940 to 1941.
 The Buffalo Bisons of the National Basketball League in 1946. 
 The BAA Buffalo of the Basketball Association of America from 1946 to 1949, although they never played a game.
 The Buffalo Bills of the All-America Football Conference from 1946 to 1949.
 The Indianapolis Clowns of the Negro American League from 1951 to 1955.
 The Buffalo White Eagles of the Eastern Canada Professional Soccer League in 1962.
 The Buffalo Braves of the National Basketball Association from 1970 to 1978.
 The Toronto-Buffalo Royals of World TeamTennis in 1974.
 The Buffalo Norsemen of the North American Hockey League from 1975 to 1976.
 The Buffalo Blazers of the Canadian National Soccer League from 1976 to 1980.
 The Buffalo Stallions of the Major Indoor Soccer League from 1979 to 1984.
 The Buffalo Storm of the United Soccer League in 1984.
The Buffalo Renegades of the National Lacrosse League (Canada) in 1991.
 The Buffalo Blizzard of the National Professional Soccer League from 1992 to 2001.
 The Buffalo Stampede of Roller Hockey International from 1994 to 1995.
 The Buffalo FFillies of the USL W-League from 1996 to 1998.
 The Buffalo Wings of Roller Hockey International and Major League Roller Hockey from 1997 to 1999.
 The Buffalo Nighthawks of the Ladies Professional Baseball League in 1998.
 The Buffalo Destroyers of the Arena Football League from 1999 to 2003.
 The Buffalo Sharks of the American Basketball Association from 2005 to 2008.
 The Queen City FC of the National Premier Soccer League from 2007 to 2008.
 The Western New York Flash of Women's Professional Soccer and the National Women's Soccer League from 2008 to 2018.
 The Buffalo City FC of the National Premier Soccer League in 2009.
 The Buffalo 716ers of the Premier Basketball League and American Basketball Association from 2013 to 2016.
 The Buffalo Blitz of American Indoor Football and Can-Am Indoor Football League from 2015 to 2017.
 The Toronto Blue Jays of the American League in 2020 and 2021.
 The Buffalo Blaze of the Premier Basketball League in 2021.

Notes and references